Raymond Ken'ichi Tanaka (August 31, 1927 – July 29, 2021) was a Japanese Roman Catholic prelate. Tanaka served as the Bishop of the Roman Catholic Diocese of Kyoto, seated in Kyoto, from July 8, 1976, until  March 3, 1997.

Tanaka was born on August 31, 1927, in Uwajima, Ehime Prefecture, Japan. He was ordained as a Catholic priest on December 21, 1951.

On July 8, 1976, Pope Paul VI appointed Tanaka as the Bishop of the Diocese of Kyoto and his ordination was held on September 23, 1976. He served as Bishop of Kyoto until his mandatory retirement March 3, 1997, but remained bishop emeritus for the rest of his life.

Bishop Emeritus Raymond Ken'ichi Tanaka died in Uwajima on July 29, 2021, at the age of 93.

References

1927 births
2021 deaths
Japanese Roman Catholic bishops
People from Uwajima, Ehime
People from Kyoto